The 1989 Family Circle Cup was a women's tennis tournament played on outdoor clay courts at the Sea Pines Plantation on Hilton Head Island, South Carolina in the United States and was part of the Category 5 tier of the 1989 WTA Tour. It was the 17th edition of the tournament and ran from April 3 through April 9, 1989. First-seeded Steffi Graf won the singles title, her third at the event.

Finals

Singles

 Steffi Graf defeated  Natasha Zvereva 6–1, 6–1
 It was Graf's 5th title of the year and the 35th of her career.

Doubles

 Hana Mandlíková /  Martina Navratilova defeated  Mary Lou Daniels /  Wendy White 6–4, 6–1
 It was Mandlíková's 2nd title of the year and the 30th of her career. It was Navratilova's 5th title of the year and the 286th of her career.

External links
 Official website
 WTA tournament edition details
 ITF tournament edition details

Family Circle Cup
Charleston Open
Family Circle Cup
Family Circle Cup
Family Circle Cup